Bullard-Ray House is a historic home located at Eden, Rockingham County, North Carolina.  The original section was built about 1830, and consists of a two-story, Greek Revival style main block with a recessed two-story wing.  It was enlarged and remodeled between 1908 and 1915 in the Colonial Revival style.  It has a hipped roof and features a broad, wrap-around porch supported by Doric order columns.

It was listed on the National Register of Historic Places in 1982.

References

Houses on the National Register of Historic Places in North Carolina
Greek Revival houses in North Carolina
Colonial Revival architecture in North Carolina
Houses completed in 1830
Houses in Rockingham County, North Carolina
National Register of Historic Places in Rockingham County, North Carolina
1830 establishments in North Carolina